Barry James is a stage actor and singer.

Theatre credits
He trained at the Guildford School of Acting.

His stage roles include:
 Seymour in the first West End production of Little Shop of Horrors at the Comedy Theatre in 1983
 as Otto Kringelein  in "Grand Hotel" at the Dominion Theatre' 1992
 Beadle Bamford in the 1994 National Theatre production of Sondheim's Sweeney Todd: The Demon Barber of Fleet Street
 Cogsworth in the first West End production of Disney's Beauty and the Beast at the Dominion Theatre (a role he reprised in the UK Tour of the show)
 Mr. Bumble in the London Palladium production of Lionel Bart's Oliver!
  Ladislav Sipos in "She Loves Me" at the Savoy Theatre London in 1994/95
 Monsieur Thénardier in the London production of Les Misérables at the Palace Theatre and Queen's Theatre
 Mr. Mushnik in the 2006 London revival of Little Shop of Horrors at the Menier Chocolate Factory and the 2007 revival at the Ambassadors Theatre
 Monsieur Richard Firminin in The Phantom of the Opera at Her Majesty's Theatre, London and the 25th Anniversary Concert at the Royal Albert Hall
 Grandpa Joe in Charlie and the Chocolate Factory at the Theatre Royal, Drury Lane

James can be heard on cast recordings of Beauty and the Beast, My Fair Lady, "She Loves Me" and two Bernard J. Taylor musicals - Nosferatu the Vampire (in which he created the role of "Renfeld"), Much Ado in which he created the role of Leonato, and Monsieur Firmin in The Phantom of the Opera 25th Anniversary Concert.  He is also Thénardier in the 1988 symphonic cast recording of Les Misérables.

Notes

The Phantom of the Opera at the Royal Albert Hall
Blu-ray/DVD and cast recording

References
Larkin, Colin; John Martland (1999). The Virgin Encyclopedia of Stage and Film Musicals, London: Virgin in association with Muze UK Ltd. .
Guide to Musical Theatre
Playbill News

English male stage actors
Year of birth missing (living people)
Living people